The Asan Invasion Beach is a historic site in the village of Asan, Guam.  The beaches of Asan were one of the landing sites of American forces in the 1944 Battle of Guam, in which the island was retaken from occupying Japanese forces.  The designated historic site includes the beaches extending between Asan Point and Adelup Point, and extends inland roughly to Guam Highway 1.  It also includes the water area extending from the beach to the reef, about  out, an area that includes at least one abandoned Allied landing vehicle.

The beaches, fortifications, and water out to the reef were listed on the National Register of Historic Places in 1979.  Portions of them are part of the Asan Beach Unit of the War in the Pacific National Historical Park, which includes a public access point at Asan Point.  Just east of this is Memorial Beach Park, a municipal beachfront park that was listed on the National Register in 1974.

See also

National Register of Historic Places listings in Guam

References

Buildings and structures on the National Register of Historic Places in Guam
Buildings and structures completed in 1944
World War II on the National Register of Historic Places in Guam
Asan, Guam
Beaches of Guam
Guam Highway 1